Rodolfo Gambini (21 September 1855 – 8 March 1928) was an Italian painter, active mainly in Milan, Lombardy, Piedmont, and Liguria. He painted both history and sacred subjects. He was born in Arluno and died in Alessandria, Piedmont.
He studied at the Accademia di Belle Arti di Brera in Milan. Piero Vignoli and Giovanni Ferraboschi were two of his pupils.

He frescoed an Ascent of Christ for the apse for the Duomo (Collegiata of San Lorenzo) of Voghera. He painted in the church of San Francesco ai Cappuccini and the Convent of San Martino in Alessandria. He painted for the parish church of San Nicolò in Pozzolo Formigaro. He painted in the church of the Sacro Cuore in the Abbey of Oulx. He painted in the church of Santa Maria Canale, Tortona. He painted for the Rocca de' Giorgi.

See also
 Fresco
 Belle Époque

References

External links
 

1855 births
1928 deaths
People from the Province of Milan
19th-century Italian painters
19th-century Italian male artists
Italian male painters
20th-century Italian painters
Painters from Lombardy
20th-century Italian male artists